Simssee is a lake in the Alpine foothills, Bavaria, Germany. At an elevation of 470.1 metres, its surface area is 6.5 km2 making it the largest lake in the Rosenheim district. The maximum depth of the lake is 22.5 m. It drains into the river Sims. The retention period of the Simssee is about one and a half years and its catchment area covers 59.51 km2.

It is the last remain of Lake Rosenheim, which stretched over the area at the end of the Würm glaciation.

See also 
 List of lakes in Bavaria

External links 
 

Lakes of Bavaria
Rosenheim (district)